Köbərkənd (also, Kəbərkənd, Keberkend, and Kiberkend) is a village and municipality in the Barda Rayon of Azerbaijan.  It has a population of 570.

References 

Populated places in Barda District